Kinross is a town in Scotland.

It may also refer to:

Places

Australia
Kinross, Western Australia a northern suburb of the city of Perth in Western Australia
Kinross Wolaroi School, a P-12, co-educational independent school in Orange, New South Wales, Australia

Canada
Kinross, Prince Edward Island, a settlement in Prince Edward Island
Mount Kinross, a mountain in Alberta, part of the Victoria Cross Ranges

South Africa
Kinross, Mpumalanga, a town in South Africa

United Kingdom
Kinross-shire, a traditional county of which Kinross is the county town
Perth and Kinross, a modern unitary council in Scotland
Kinross House, a late 17th-century country house near Kinross in Perth and Kinross, Scotland

United States
Kinross, Iowa, a city in Keokuk County, Iowa, United States
Kinross Charter Township, Michigan, a charter township in Chippewa County in the U.S. state of Michigan

People
Kinross (surname)

Other
Baron Kinross, a title in the Peerage of the United Kingdom
Kinross Gold, a Canadian mining company

See also 

 Kinloss, Scotland, a village in Moray
 Kinloss (disambiguation)